The Caldwell County Railroad  is a Class III shortline railroad operating over  between Hickory and Lenoir, North Carolina. The CWCY is operated by Southeast Shortlines, Inc., which also operates the Thermal Belt Railway.

History
The Caldwell County Railroad was formed in 1994 when Norfolk Southern sold the  line from Hickory to Lenoir to the Caldwell County Economic Development Commission (CCEDC). The CCEDC subsequently leased the line to the Caldwell County Railroad Company, a subsidiary of Southeast Shortlines Inc.

The line was originally constructed as  gauge in 1874, under the charter of the Chester & Lenoir. The line was part of the subsequent reorganization into the Carolina & North-Western Railway in 1897, which was absorbed into the Southern Railway around 1940. As part of the Thoroughbred Shortline Program, the line was spun off to the Carolina and Northwestern Railroad, which operated the line from 1990 to 1994.

On March 21, 2007, the CWCY filed a request with the Surface Transportation Board to abandon  of its line near Lenoir to near Valmead. The request was approved on July 9, 2007.

Operations

The railroad serves 5 customers, handling approximately 425 carloads per year. Commodities carried by the railroad are plastics and building materials. The CWCY interchanges with Norfolk Southern at Hickory.

The CWCY uses radio frequency 161.17500, under license WPGG862, for all of their operations.

The Caldwell County Railroad operates 2 locomotives, numbers 1747 and 1811. Both units are EMD GP-16's and were purchased from CSX. They are still in the Family Lines System livery.

Cities/Towns served
Hickory
Rhodhiss
Granite Falls
Hudson
Lenoir

See also

Carolina & North-Western Railway
Southern Railway
Thoroughbred Shortline Program

References

External links
Railway Association of North Carolina - CWRY
American Short Line & Regional Railroad Association: CWCY
Caldwell County Economic Development Commission

North Carolina railroads
Railway companies established in 1994
1994 establishments in North Carolina
Spin-offs of the Norfolk Southern Railway
Transportation in Caldwell County, North Carolina
Transportation in Catawba County, North Carolina
Companies based in North Carolina
Caldwell County, North Carolina
Catawba County, North Carolina